Taguayabón is a Cuban village and consejo popular (ward) of the municipality of Camajuaní, in Villa Clara Province. In 2012 it had a population of 2053.

History
The village, whose name means "butterfly village" in Taíno language, was founded in 1830. Until 1976, it was part of the former municipality of San Antonio de las Vueltas (or Vueltas), merged in Camajuaní.

Geography
Located on a rural plain surrounded by scattered hills, between Camajuaní (7.7 km west) and Remedios (11 km east); Taguayabón spans on two main crossroads: "Calle José Martí"  and the "Circuito Norte" . Nearest places are the villages of Palenque (3 km east), Entronque de Vueltas (3 km west) and Vega de Palma (5 km west). The village is 9 km from Vueltas, 20 from Caibarién, 26 from Placetas, 34 from Santa Clara and 80 from Cayo Santa María.

The local government area of the "Consejo Popular de Taguayabón" includes the villages of Carolina, Corea, La Julia, Las Lechugas, Lobatón, Rosalía and Palenque.

Government 
Camajuaní has multiple Constituency Delegate (Delegado Circunscripción) for every ward, Taguayabón’s ward has:  

 Constituency Delegate #63 Javier Morffi Pérez
 Constituency Delegate #71 Rafael Gómez Morales
 Constituency Delegate #72 Rafael Gómez Morales
 Constituency Delegate #73 José A. Hernández Gómez
 Constituency Delegate #75 Roberto Cruz Ramos

Transport
Taguayabón is crossed in the middle by the state highway "Circuito Norte" (CN) and counts a railway station on the line Santa Clara-Camajuaní-Remedios-Caibarién. Nearest airport, the "Abel Santamaría" of Santa Clara , is 30 km west.

Economy
According at the DMPF of Camajuani, Taguayabón is a settlement linked to sources of employment or economic development. 

The Provincial Tobacco Company La Estrella has territory in La Quinta, Camajuani, Aguada de Moya, San Antonio de las Vueltas, and Taguayabón. 

In order to make charcoal in Camajuani you need to live in Luis Arcos Bergnes or Taguayabón.

Education 
There are a few schools in the ward of Taguayabón, these include: 

 Pelayo Cuervo Primary
 ESBU Clemente Cárdenas Ávila Secondary

Infrastructure 
In La Quinta, Taguayabón, San Antonio de las Vueltas, and Vega de Palma there are a combined total of 13 Municipal Collection Establishment squares.

See also
Parrandas
Municipalities of Cuba
List of cities in Cuba

References

External links

Taguayabón Weather on accuweather.com

Populated places in Villa Clara Province
Populated places established in 1830
1830 establishments in North America
1830 establishments in the Spanish Empire